Livio Caputo (24 August 1933 – 14 June 2021) was an Italian politician and journalist who served as a Senator.

References

1933 births
2021 deaths
Italian journalists
Italian politicians
Senators of Legislature XII of Italy
Forza Italia politicians
University of Turin alumni
Politicians from Vienna
People from Bergamo